Laneella is a genus of Neotropical flies in the family Mesembrinellidae, and formerly placed in the Calliphoridae. There are 2 described species.

Species
L. nigripes Guimarães, 1977
L. perisi (Mariluis, 1987)

References

Mesembrinellidae
Diptera of South America